The women's 1500 metres competition at the 2020 European Speed Skating Championships was held on 10 January 2020.

Results
The race was started at 19:30.

References

Women's 1500 metres